Jin Lipeng (born July 22, 1978 in Liaoning, China) is a Chinese professional basketball player. He currently plays for the Zhejiang Lions of the Chinese Basketball Association.  He is also a member of the Chinese national basketball team.

Professional career
Jin played for the Zhejiang Lions in the 2009–10 CBA season.  He averaged 13.3 points per game in 38 games for the Lions.  He is a noted three-point specialist, shooting 42.4% from long distance in the 2009-10 season while taking 60 more three-pointers than two-pointers.

Chinese national team
Jin is also a member of the Chinese national basketball team.  He participated at various levels of junior competition in the 1990s for the Chinese team.  He was named to his first major international competition at the 2010 FIBA World Championship in Turkey. At 32 years old, he was the second oldest member of the Chinese squad.

References

1978 births
Living people
Basketball players from Liaoning
Chinese men's basketball players
Shooting guards
Zhejiang Golden Bulls players
Zhejiang Lions players
2010 FIBA World Championship players